Gorno Tserovene is a village in Montana Municipality, Montana Province, northwestern Bulgaria.

References

Villages in Montana Province